Local elections was held in  Santa Rosa, Laguna, on May 14, 2007, within the Philippine general election. The voters elected for the elective local posts in the city: the mayor, vice mayor, and ten councilors.

Overview
Incumbent Mayor Jose Catindig, Jr. decided to run for mayor under Kampi. Her opponent Incumbent Vice Mayor Arlene Arcillas-Nazareno is a nominee under  Lakas And Former Mayor Roberto "Tito" Gonzales Under Uno. Gonzales also served as Mayor from 1988 to 1998.

Mayor Catindig' running mate is incumbent Councilor Lody Carta Under Kampi His opponents are Incumbent Councilor Boy Factoriza, who is also under Lakas, Former Councilor Eric Puzon Under Uno  And Incumbent Barangay Chairman Manuel Alipon is a nominee under Independent

2004 santa rosa local elections

Candidates

Administration's Ticket

Opposition's Ticket

Results
The candidates for mayor and vice mayor with the highest number of votes wins the seat; they are voted separately, therefore, they may be of different parties when elected.

Mayoral and vice mayoral elections

Santa Rosa City

City Council Elections

Voters will elect ten (10) councilors to comprise the City Council or the Sangguniang Panlungsod. Candidates are voted separately so there are chances where winning candidates will have unequal number of votes and may come from different political parties. The ten candidates with the highest number of votes win the seats.

 
 
 
 
 
 
 
 
 
 
|-
|bgcolor=black colspan=5|

References

External links

2007 Philippine local elections
Elections in Santa Rosa, Laguna
2007 elections in Calabarzon